Vetulonia is a genus of sea snails, marine gastropod mollusks, unassigned in the superfamily Seguenzioidea.

Description
(Original description) The small shell is turbiniform, thin and umbilicated. It shows  radiating ribs crossing spiral threads . The peristome is interrupted by the body whorl . The outer lip in the completely adult is reflected and somewhat thickened. The aperture is unarmed.

Species
Species within the genus Vetulonia include:
 Vetulonia densilirata Dall, 1927
 Vetulonia galapagana Dall, 1913
 Vetulonia giacobbei Renda & Micali, 2016
 Vetulonia parajeffreysi Absalão & Pimenta, 2005
 Vetulonia paucivaricosa (Dautzenberg, 1889)
 Vetulonia phalcata Warén & Bouchet, 1993
 † Vetulonia philippinensis Kiel, Aguilar & Kase, 2020 

 Species brought into synonymy
 Vetulonia cancellata (Jeffreys, 1883): synonym of Vetulonia paucivaricosa (Dautzenberg, 1889)
 Vetulonia jeffreysi Dall, 1913: synonym of Vetulonia paucivaricosa (Dautzenberg, 1889)
 Vetulonia josephinae Dall, 1927: synonym of Vetulonia paucivaricosa (Dautzenberg, 1889)

References

 Warén, A. & Bouchet, P. (1993). New records, species, genera, and a new family of gastropods from hydrothermal vents and hydrocarbon seeps. Zoologica Scripta. 22: 1-90.
 Spencer, H.G., Marshall, B.A. & Willan, R.C. (2009). Checklist of New Zealand living Mollusca. Pp 196-219. in: Gordon, D.P. (ed.) New Zealand inventory of biodiversity. Volume one. Kingdom Animalia: Radiata, Lophotrochozoa, Deuterostomia. Canterbury University Press,

External links
 Kano, Y.; Chikyu, E.; Warén, A. (2009). Morphological, ecological and molecular characterization of the enigmatic planispiral snail genus Adeuomphalus (Vetigastropoda: Seguenzioidea. Journal of Molluscan Studies. 75(4): 397-418.